Zhu Shouju (1892 – 31 December 1966), born Zhu Junbo, also known by his pen name Haishang Shuomengren, was a Chinese author and filmmaker based in Shanghai.

He began his career as a writer of serialized novels. In 1924 he became the chief editor of Movie Magazine (電影雜誌) and in the same year founded the Lilium Pictures Company (百合影片公司). In 1925 it merged with another film company to become the Great China Lilium Pictures Company (大中華百合影片公司), with Zhu serving as its general manager. Zhu directed at least 15 films in the 1920s, including at least 3 starring Ruan Lingyu who later became a superstar. The majority of his films have been lost, but his 1925 film The Stormy Night was accidentally re-discovered in Tokyo, Japan in the 21st century.

Works translated into English

Filmography

References

External links

1892 births
1966 deaths
Film directors from Shanghai
Screenwriters from Shanghai
20th-century Chinese novelists
Chinese silent film directors
Chinese male short story writers
Republic of China short story writers
Short story writers from Shanghai
Republic of China novelists
20th-century screenwriters